Major League Baseball recognizes the player or players in each league with the most wins each season. In baseball, wins are a statistic used to evaluate pitchers. Credit for a win is given by the official scorer to the pitcher whose team takes and maintains the lead while he is the pitcher of record. If a game is tied or if the lead changes to the other team, all pitchers who have participated and exited the game to that point are unable to receive credit for the victory. A starting pitcher is ineligible for the win if he has not completed five or more innings of the game; instead, the scorer would award the victory to the relief pitcher who was "most effective... in the official scorer's judgment".

History
The National League's first win champion was Albert Spalding, who led the senior circuit with 47 wins after leading the semi-professional National Association in each of its five seasons. Hall of Fame pitcher Cy Young led the American League in wins in each of its first three years (1901–1903), amassing 33, 32, and 28 victories in those seasons for the Boston Americans. Warren Spahn leads all players with 8 win championships for the Boston and Milwaukee Braves in his 21 seasons.

Six titles

Three players have led their league in wins six times during their careers. Grover Cleveland Alexander led the National League in victories six times, with a single-season career-high 33 wins in 1916. In the American League, two pitchers have accomplished the same feat: Walter Johnson, whose 36 wins in 1913—his first season leading the league—were a single-season career high, and Bob Feller.

Five and four titles
In addition to his three American League wins, Young also led the National League twice (1892, 1895) to amass the third-highest total of win championships in major league history. Joe McGinnity and Tom Glavine also captured five wins titles in the National League. Pitchers who have led their league four times include Steve Carlton, Roger Clemens, Christy Mathewson, Hal Newhouser, and Robin Roberts.

Most wins in a Major League season

Charles "Old Hoss" Radbourn holds the single-season record for the most games won in a major league season; he notched 59 victories in 1884. There is a discrepancy in Radbourn's victory total in 1884. The classic MacMillan Baseball Encyclopedia, as well as other sources credit Radbourn with 60 wins (against 12 losses), other sources place his win total as high as 62.  He and John Clarkson (53 wins in 1885) are the only pitchers to exceed 50 wins in a single season in the current major leagues; Guy Hecker also accomplished the feat in the American Association. The American League leader is Jack Chesbro, who won 41 games for the New York Yankees in 1904; his total is the highest since Major League Baseball's consolidation in 1901. The highest total in the National League since 1901 is Mathewson's 37 victories in 1908. The largest margin of victory for the title is 21 wins, achieved by Clarkson in 1889; he won 49 games, while his closest competitors (Charlie Buffinton and Tim Keefe) won 28 each. The American League title's largest margin of victory is 16 wins—Ed Walsh notched 40 wins in 1908, followed by Addie Joss and Ed Summers with 24 victories.

The number of wins required to lead the league each season has gone down significantly over the last century. For example, from 1900 to 1920, the average number of wins for the AL league leader was 30.8; from 1990 to 2010, it was 20.9.

Ties
Ties for the win championship are common. The most recent tie in the American League was in 2012, when Jered Weaver  and David Price tied for the lead with 20 wins each, and the most recent tie in the National League was in 2011, when Ian Kennedy and Clayton Kershaw tied with 21 wins each. The most pitchers to share the title in a single season is six, accomplished in 2006 when Aaron Harang, Derek Lowe, Brad Penny, John Smoltz, Brandon Webb, and Carlos Zambrano each won 16 games in the National League. In the American League, four pitchers shared the award in the strike-shortened 1981 season.

Key

National League

American League

Other major leagues

Footnotes

Recognized "major leagues" include the current American and National Leagues and several defunct leagues—the American Association, the Federal League, the Players' League, and the Union Association.
 A pitcher must throw a minimum of one inning per game scheduled for his team during the season (60 innings in 2020, pandemic-shortened;  typically 162 innings) to qualify for the win title.

References
General

Inline citations

Wins